Majidabad (also Romanized as Majīdābād) is a village in Savalan Rural District, in the Central District of Parsabad County, Ardabil Province, Iran. At the 2006 census, its population was 10,000, in 1,400 families.

References 

Towns and villages in Parsabad County